Iraqi or Iraqis (in plural) means from Iraq, a country in the Middle East, and may refer to:
 Iraqi people or Iraqis, people from Iraq or of Iraqi descent
 A citizen of Iraq, see demographics of Iraq
 Iraqi or Araghi, someone or something of, from, or related to Persian Iraq, an old name for a region in Central Iran
 Iraqi Arabic, the colloquial form of Arabic spoken in Iraq
 Iraqi cuisine
 Iraqi culture
The Iraqis (party), a political party in Iraq
Iraqi List,  a political party in Iraq
Fakhr-al-Din Iraqi, 13th-century Persian poet and Sufi.

See also 
 List of Iraqis
 Iraqi diaspora 
 Languages of Iraq
 

Language and nationality disambiguation pages